Edificio Correos (Spanish: "Postal Building or Mail Building") is a major landmark and postal center of the city of San José, Costa Rica.

References

External links
Official site

Museums in San José, Costa Rica
Buildings and structures in San José, Costa Rica
Government buildings completed in 1917
Post office buildings
Philately of Costa Rica
Philatelic museums
Tourist attractions in San José, Costa Rica